Ole Rahmel (born 19 November 1989) is a German handball player for SL Benfica and the German national team.

Honours
Benfica
EHF European League: 2021–22

References

1989 births
Living people
German male handball players